The political positions of Vladimir Putin can refer to:

Domestic policy of Vladimir Putin
Foreign policy of Vladimir Putin
and also, more broadly:
Russia under Vladimir Putin
Political career of Vladimir Putin